This is a list of the top 50 singles of 2001 in New Zealand.

The New Zealand charts are based on a combination of sales and radio airplay. Anika Moa's hit "Youthful" was never released as a single in New Zealand and achieved its position based on radio airplay alone.

Chart

Key
 – Single of New Zealand origin

References

2001 in New Zealand music
2001 record charts
Singles 2001